Encounter is a 2013 action thriller Bengali film directed by Suman Mukhopadhyay and produced by Kamini Tewari. The film features newcomers Dhiraj and Koel Das in the lead roles. Music of the film has been composed by Sanku Mitra.

Plot 
The story of the film revolves around the affinity between administration, police and the underworld. It depicts that how our administrators make use of the underworld to fulfill their own wishes. The film is about four people who later become involved with the underworld.

Cast 
 Dheeraj Pandit
 Koel Das
 Ferdous Ahmed
 Rajesh Sharma
 Shantilal Mukherjee
Pallavi Chatterjee
 Biswajit Chakraborty
 Rita Koyral
 Soumen Mahapatra

Soundtrack 

Shanku Mitra composed the music for Encounter. Lyrics are penned by Goutam Sushmit. The music launch was held at The Park on 2 September 2013. The soundtrack consists of six tracks. The playback singers include Usha Uthup, Kumar Sanu, Rima, Mohammed Aziz, Archan, Sujoy Bhowmick, Raghab Chatterjee and Sanchita Bhattacharya.

References 

Bengali-language Indian films
2010s Bengali-language films
2013 films
Indian action thriller films
2013 action thriller films